Dunbeath is a village in south-east Caithness, Scotland on the A9 road. It sits astride the Dunbeath Water just before it enters the sea at Dunbeath Bay.

Dunbeath has a very rich archaeological landscape, the site of numerous Iron Age brochs and an early medieval monastic site (see Alex Morrison's archaeological survey, "Dunbeath: A Cultural Landscape".)

There is a community museum/landscape interpretation centre at the old village school (http://www.dunbeath-heritage.org.uk).

Prince George, Duke of Kent, was killed when his Short Sunderland flying boat crashed on a Dunbeath hillside on 25 August 1942.

Notable people 
It was the birthplace of Neil M. Gunn (1891–1973), author of Highland River and others, many of whose novels are set in Dunbeath and its Strath. Of Dunbeath's landscape, Gunn wrote: "These small straths, like the Strath of Dunbeath, have this intimate beauty. In boyhood we get to know every square yard of it. We encompass it physically and our memories hold it. Birches, hazel trees for nutting, pools with trout and an occasionally visible salmon, river-flats with the wind on the bracken and disappearing rabbit scuts, a wealth of wild flower and small bird life, the soaring hawk, the unexpected roe, the ancient graveyard, thoughts of the folk who once lived far inland in straths and hollows, the past and the present held in a moment of day-dream." ('My Bit of Britain', 1941.).

John N Sutherland, graduate of Glasgow, St Andrews and Edinburgh Universities, former Professor of Virtual Reality at Gifu University in Japan, founder of video games as an academic discipline, was brought up in Dunbeath and attended Dunbeath Primary School and Dunbeath Parish Church.

References 

Populated places in Caithness